Wengen may also refer to:

Places
 Wengen, a village and winter resort in Switzerland
 Wengen railway station
 La Val, a commune in South Tyrol, Italy with the German name "Wengen"
 Wengen, a village in the municipality of Nennslingen in Mittelfranken, Germany
 Wengen, a place in the municipality of Weitnau im Allgäu, Germany
 Wengen, a place in the municipality of Sulzbach-Laufen in Landkreis Schwäbisch Hall in Baden-Württemberg, Germany
 Wengen, a place in the municipality of Dießen am Ammersee in Bavaria, Germany

People
 Gu Wengen (born 1946), Chinese retired vice-admiral
 Liang Wengen (born 1956), Chinese billionaire entrepreneur

See also
 Wingen (disambiguation), various places

Chinese masculine given names